Marlon Pereira Freire (born 26 March 1987 ) is an Aruban footballer who plays as a full back for Steeds Hooger. Born in the Netherlands, Pereira represents the Aruba national football team.

Career
Pereira started his career with amateur clubs Sparta AV, Steeds Hooger and Noorderkwartier. Then he was scouted to play for the VUC talent pool, which educates young players to play for professional football clubs. In January 2008 he signed a 3-year deal with Willem II. First he played for the reserve squad, but in the first Eredivisie 2009-10 match against Vitesse (3–1 win), he made his first professional appearance.

International career
Pereira made his professional debut for the Aruba national football team in a 0-0 2019–20 CONCACAF Nations League qualifying tie with Guadeloupe on 16 October 2018.

References

External links
 Voetbal International profile 

1987 births
Living people
Footballers from Rotterdam
Aruban footballers
Aruba international footballers
Dutch footballers
Dutch people of Aruban descent
Dutch sportspeople of Cape Verdean descent
Dutch expatriate footballers
Eredivisie players
Tweede Divisie players
Derde Divisie players
First Professional Football League (Bulgaria) players
Willem II (football club) players
SC Cambuur players
Botev Plovdiv players
K Beerschot VA players
SteDoCo players
Aruban expatriate footballers
Expatriate footballers in Bulgaria
Expatriate footballers in Belgium
Association football defenders